is the governor of Tochigi Prefecture in Japan, first elected in 2004. A native of Imaichi, Tochigi and graduate of Nihon University, he had served in the city assembly of Utsunomiya, Tochigi since 1983 and then in the Tochigi Prefectural Assembly since 1991. He also served as mayor of Utsunomiya for two terms from 1999 until his election as governor in 2004. He was reelected on November 16, 2008, in a two-person election.

References

External links 
 Official website 

Mayors of places in Tochigi Prefecture
Nihon University alumni
1953 births
Living people
Governors of Tochigi Prefecture
Japanese municipal councilors
Politicians from Tochigi Prefecture